Koxtag (Kuoshitage, Qoshtagh, Kuoshi Tage, K'o-shih-t'a-ko;  / , formerly  / ) is a town in Pishan/Guma County, Hotan Prefecture, Xinjiang, China.

History
In 1958, Yuejin Commune ('Leap Forward commune' ) was created.

In 1978, Yuejin Commune was renamed Koxtag Commune (Keshitage).

In 1984, Koxtag Commune became Koxtag Township.

The 2011 Pishan hostage crisis occurred in Koxtag.

On July 24, 2015, Koxtag was changed from a township to a town.

Administrative divisions

Koxtag includes one residential community and fifteen villages:

Residential community (Mandarin Chinese Hanyu Pinyin-derived names except where Uyghur is provided):
 Kuoshitage
Villages:
 Sugaitelike (Sugaite Likecun), Kuoshitage, Bositan, Azigan'aledi, Jiayinagute, Bomuga, Tugemanboyi, Tiereke'aledi, Keshilake, Wulebage, Keyikeqi, Karesu, Daiyaboyi, Bashi'azigan, Sulighaz (Sulegazi;  / )

References

Populated places in Xinjiang
Township-level divisions of Xinjiang